Simon Wilkinson may refer to:

 Simon Wilkinson (composer) (born 1972), British musician and composer
 Simon Wilkinson (transmedia artist), British transmedia artist